Lich, in fantasy fiction, is a type of undead creature.

Lich may also refer to:

Places
Lich, Hesse, a town in Hesse, Germany
Long Island College Hospital (LICH), Brooklyn, New York, US
Lich (pulsar) or PSR B1257+12, a pulsar and star system in the constellation Virgo

People
 Tamara Lich, Canadian political activist

Characters
Lich (Dungeons & Dragons), the original application of the term for undead sorcerers
Lich (comics), a Marvel Comics character
The Lich, a fictional character, the titular character from the eponymous episode "The Lich" of the animated TV show Adventure Time

Other uses
"The Lich", a 2012 episode of the TV series Adventure Time

See also

List of liches
Lich King
Lich Lords
Demilich (disambiguation)

Lichfield (disambiguation)
Litchfield (disambiguation)
Litch (disambiguation)